Mark Tomforde is an American mathematician and Professor of Mathematics 
at University of Colorado Colorado Springs. He works in the areas of functional analysis and algebra, and he earned his Ph.D. in mathematics at Dartmouth College in 2002.  Tomforde's research interests are in operator algebras and C*-algebras, and he has made contributions to the study of graph C*-algebras and Leavitt path algebras.  He was an invited speaker at the 2015 Abel Symposium, and he is a founding member of the Algebras and Rings in Colorado Springs (ARCS) center.  He has also received several awards for his teaching and outreach efforts.

Contributions to Graph C*-algebras and Leavitt Path Algebras

Tomforde has made fundamental contributions to the related areas of graph C*-algebras and Leavitt path algebras. With Doug Drinen, he is co-creator of the Drinen-Tomforde desingularization, often simply called desingularization.  Desingularization allows one to extend many results for row-finite graphs to countable graphs, and it has become a standard tool in the study of graph C*-algebras and Leavitt path algebras.

With Gene Abrams, Tomforde has formulated the Abrams-Tomforde conjectures, which state that the Leavitt path algebras of two graphs are Morita equivalent as rings (respectively, isomorphic as rings) if and only if the C*-algebras of the two graphs are Morita equivalent as C*-algebras (respectively, isomorphic as C*-algebras).  Abrams and Tomforde have verified certain special cases of the conjectures, and in 2020 Søren Eilers, Gunnar Restorff, Efren Ruiz, and Adam P.W. Sørensen completed a classification of unital graph C*-algebras that allowed them to verify the Abrams-Tomforde conjectures for graphs with a finite number of vertices.

Tomforde is also the creator of ultragraph C*-algebras, which are C*-algebras constructed from a generalization of a directed graph, known as an ultragraph.  The ultragraph C*-algebras simultaneously generalize the classes of graph C*-algebras and Exel-Laca algebras, and allow one to apply graph techniques to the study of Exel-Laca algebras.

In his research, Tomforde has connected ideas from Functional Analysis and Algebra, and he has used techniques and methods from each subject to contribute to the study of the other. Tomforde has also been active in organizing several conferences on graph C*-algebras and their generalizations, with the goal of 
bringing together analysts and algebraists to share ideas and collaborate.

Teaching and Outreach

Tomforde's teaching and outreach activities have been recognized in several ways.  He created and directed the Cougars and Houston Area Mathematics Program (CHAMP), which ran from Fall 2013 to Spring 2019 and used volunteer effort to provide tutoring and math circle activities to underserved high school and middle school students in Houston.  In 2016 CHAMP received an award from Phi Beta Kappa for being an organization that serves as a national model for building creative exchanges with diverse audiences in the arts, humanities, social sciences, natural sciences or mathematics.  In 2016 CHAMP also received the Award for Mathematics Programs that Make a Difference from the American Mathematical Society. In 2017, Tomforde was appointed to the STEM Advisory Board for KIPP, to provide guidance and recommendations regarding STEM education in KIPP's Houston schools.

In addition to numerous college and university teaching awards, in 2019 Tomforde was recognized with the MAA Texas Section's Distinguished College and University Teaching of Mathematics Award.  In 2020 he was the recipient of the Deborah and Franklin Haimo Award for Distinguished College or University Teaching of Mathematics, the highest teaching honor bestowed by the Mathematical Association of America, for his "deep and positive impact at all levels of mathematics education".

Honors and awards
Deborah and Franklin Tepper Haimo Award for Distinguished College or University Teaching of Mathematics, 2020
Distinguished College and University Teaching of Mathematics Award, Texas Section of the MAA, 2019
AMS Award for Programs that Make a Difference, 2018
Phi Beta Kappa Award for Engaging Broader Audiences, 2018
University Teaching Excellence Award, University of Houston, 2016
John C. Butler Excellence in Teaching Award, College of Natural Science and Mathematics at the University of Houston, 2015

References

External links
Home page

20th-century American mathematicians
21st-century American mathematicians
Living people
Year of birth missing (living people)
Dartmouth College alumni
Gustavus Adolphus College alumni